Justin Hugh Brown  is a senior Australian public servant and former officer with the Australian Department of Foreign Affairs and Trade. Brown is currently a non-executive director of Wine Australia, a statutory corporation that promotes and regulates the Australian wine industry.

Diplomatic career
First educated at Marist College Canberra, Brown earned a Bachelor of Economics from the University of New England.

From 2004 to 2006, Brown held the post of Ambassador for the Environment and Chief Negotiator on Climate Change.

Brown's posts have included First Assistant Secretary, Office of Trade Negotiations; First Assistant Secretary, Consular and Crisis Management Division; High Commissioner to Canada (2008-2011); and Deputy Head of Mission, Australian Embassy, Brussels (1999–2001).

In July 2015, Brown was awarded the Public Service Medal (PSM) for "outstanding public service in leading the Department of Foreign Affairs and Trade's Canberra-based crisis response to the downing of Malaysia Airlines flight MH17."

He held the post of Ambassador to Belgium, Luxembourg, the European Union and NATO from February 2018 to January 2021.

References

Australian diplomats
Department of Foreign Affairs and Trade (Australia)
University of New England (Australia) alumni
Living people
Ambassadors of Australia to Luxembourg
Ambassadors of Australia to Belgium
Ambassadors of Australia to the European Union
Ambassadors of Australia to NATO
Recipients of the Public Service Medal (Australia)
High Commissioners of Australia to Canada
Year of birth missing (living people)